Poems on Several Occasions may refer to:

 Poems on Several Occasions (Lady Mary Chudleigh) by Lady Mary Chudleigh, 1703
 Poems on Several Occasions (Matthew Prior) by Matthew Prior, 1707, 1709, 1718, 1721
 Poems on Several Occasions (Henry Carey) by Henry Carey, 1713
 Poems on Several Occasions (John Gay) by John Gay, 1720
 Poems on Several Occasions (Christopher Smart) by Christopher Smart, 1752
 Poems on Several Occasions (Michael Bruce) by Michael Bruce, 1770
 Poems on Several Occasions (James Graeme) by James Graeme, 1773